PMAT may refer to:

 Plasma membrane monoamine transporter (PMAT)
 Four  phases of mitosis: prophase, metaphase, anaphase, and telophase.
 Prophase: Chromatin into chromosomes, the nuclear envelope break down, chromosomes attach to spindle fibres by their centromeres.
 Metaphase: Chromosomes line up along the metaphase plate (centre of the cell).
 Anaphase: Sister chromatids are pulled to opposite poles of the cell.
 Telophase: Two new nuclear envelopes form, chromosomes unfold into chromatin, cytokinesis can begin.
 Cytokinesis: The process that finally splits the parent cell into two identical daughter cells.